Leśniaki may refer to the following places:
Leśniaki, Gmina Rusiec in Łódź Voivodeship (central Poland)
Leśniaki, Gmina Szczerców in Łódź Voivodeship (central Poland)
Leśniaki, Masovian Voivodeship (east-central Poland)
Leśniaki, Będzin County in Silesian Voivodeship (south Poland)
Leśniaki, Częstochowa County in Silesian Voivodeship (south Poland)